This article contains an overview of the year 1989 in athletics.

International Events
 African Championships
 Asian Championships
 Balkan Games
 Central American and Caribbean Championships
 Bolivarian Games
 European Indoor Championships
 Jeux de la Francophonie
 South American Championships
 World Cross Country Championships
 World Indoor Championships
 World Student Games

World records

Men

Women

Men's Best Year Performers

100 metres

200 metres

400 metres

800 metres

1,500 metres

Mile

3,000 metres

5,000 metres

10,000 metres

Half Marathon

Marathon

110m Hurdles

400m Hurdles

3,000m Steeplechase

High Jump

Long Jump

Triple Jump

Discus

Shot Put

Hammer

Javelin (new design)

Pole Vault

Decathlon

Women's Best Year Performers

60 metres

100 metres

200 metres

400 metres

800 metres

1,500 metres

 Ivan ran 3:59.23 for 1500m on her way to the mile world record of 4:15.61 in Nice.

Mile

3,000 metres

5,000 metres

10,000 metres

Half Marathon

Marathon

60m Hurdles

100m Hurdles

400m Hurdles

High Jump

Long Jump

Shot Put

Javelin (old design)

Heptathlon

Marathons

International Races

Births
 January 1 — Fatih Avan, Turkish javelin thrower
 January 24 — Gong Lijiao, Chinese shot putter
 February 25 — Vira Rebryk, Ukrainian javelin thrower
 June 15 — Teddy Tamgho, French triple jumper
 June 24 — Teklemariam Medhin, Eritrean long-distance runner
 July 1 — Abdinasir Said Ibrahim, Somali distance runner
 August 16 — Wang Hao, Chinese race walker
 September 12 — Aberu Kebede, Ethiopian long distance runner
 December 5 — Linet Masai, Kenyan distance runner

Deaths
 June 22 — Lee Calhoun (56), American athlete (b. 1933)

References
 Year Lists
 1989 Year Rankings
 Association of Road Racing Statisticians

 
Athletics (track and field) by year